Dharma Kidangu Mosque is a mosque situated in Angappa Naicken Street in the Georgetown neighbourhood of Chennai, India. It is considered to be the oldest mosque in Muthialpet. The original mosque built of stone was demolished in 2008 and a new mosque built.

References 

 

Mosques in Chennai